Hurricane Hiki was the third-wettest tropical cyclone on record in the United States, behind Hurricane Lane in 2018, and Hurricane Harvey in 2017. It was also considered the first official hurricane in the vicinity of the Hawaiian Islands. The fourth tropical cyclone of the 1950 Pacific hurricane season, Hiki formed as a tropical depression to the southeast of Hawaii on August 12. On the following day, the depression headed northwestward and intensified into Tropical Storm Hiki. While paralleling the Hawaiian Islands on August 16, Hiki strengthened into a hurricane. Around that time, the storm peaked with maximum sustained winds of 85 mph (140 km/h). The following day, Hiki curved southwestward on August 17. Two days later, the hurricane resumed moving northwestward and weakened to a tropical storm shortly thereafter. Around midday on August 21, Hiki weakened to a tropical depression and dissipated about six hours later.

Although Hiki was a small tropical cyclone and bypassed Hawaii, heavy rainfall and strong winds were observed throughout the islands. The Waimea River overflowed, causing more than 200 residents to flee their homes. Many streets and several hundred acres of sugar cane fields were flooded. About $200,000 (1950 USD) in damage was reported due to flooding in the city of Waimea. In Kekaha, the powerhouse suffered severe damage. Throughout the islands, winds de-roofed several homes and downed power lines; one fatality occurred after a person came in contact with a live wire.

Meteorological history

According to ship reports during the summer, the Intertropical Convergence Zone was farther north than usual, which created favorable conditions for tropical cyclogenesis. Thereafter, the storm gradually intensified, becoming a tropical storm at 06:00 UTC on August 13. It was named Hiki, which is Hawaiian for Able. While situated east of Hilo, Hawaii, the system was described as an "immature storm", and had a very small diameter. Shortly thereafter, a reconnaissance aircraft flew into Hiki and estimated that sustained wind speeds between 50 and 60 mph (80 and 100 km/h). Further intensification continued and the system strengthened into a hurricane on August 16. Upon reaching hurricane intensity on August 16, Hiki simultaneously attained its maximum sustained wind speed of 85 mph (140 km/h). Hiki remained between 100 and 200 mi (160 and 320 km) offshore while paralleling several Hawaiian Islands, including Hawaii, Maui, Molokai, Oahu, and Kauai.

As a high pressure ridge intensified, the northwestward movement of Hiki was blocked, causing the storm to briefly turn due west on August 17. The high pressure ridge eventually influenced the hurricane to re-curve southwestward. After the reconnaissance aircraft flight into the storm on August 18, residents of Kauai and Oahu were alerted of a possible cyclonic loop. However, later that day, the high pressure ridge weakened, causing Hiki to turned westward and pass south of French Frigate Shoals and Midway Island. Late on August 19, Hiki weakened to a tropical storm and then  resumed its course to the northwest. By August 21, Hiki further weakened to a tropical depression, and dissipated six hours later.

The hurricane was also followed by the Air Weather Service, located on Guam, who assigned the name Salome from the Pacific typhoon naming lists.

Preparations and impact

Hiki was one of the strongest tropical cyclones to approach the Hawaiian Islands in at least 45 years and officially the first hurricane in the region. As Hiki approached, a United States Coast Guard station with 14 people in French Frigate Shoals was alerted. In addition, ships in the area were also advised to take caution. Hiki caused high waves on some of the Hawaiian Islands. Hawaii remained on the southern semicircle of Hiki, and as a result, light wind damage occurred. The islands of Niihau and Lanai also experienced tropical storm force winds, reaching 48 and 50 mph (77 and 80 km/h), respectively. As a result, several houses throughout the Hawaiian Islands lost their roof. In addition, a farmer in Kohala on Hawaii died after coming into contact with a live wire that was blown down from high winds.

Hiki was the wettest tropical cyclone in United States history, as rainfall of over  observed at the Kanalohuluhulu Ranger Station on Kauai between August 14 and August 18. The rain gauge was capable of holding  of the rain and was emptied on August 15. However, less than 24 hours later, the same rain gauge was overflowing. Heavy precipitation was also recorded on other locations on that island, including  on Mount Waialeale. Few reports exist on rainfall totals on other Hawaiian Islands, with the only other island recording rainfall was Maui, with precipitation reaching  on August 15. This was the highest 24‑hour record for that island in the month of August. On Kauai, the Waimea River experienced one of the worst flood in its history, causing more than 200 residents in Waimea Valley to evacuate. The river also rose near the mouth of its tributary, the Makaweli River, flooding the town of Waimea, causing about $200,000 in damage. The streets on the island and hundreds of acres of sugar cane were flooded. Additionally, severe damage was reported at the Kekaha Powerhouse.

See also

List of Hawaii hurricanes
List of wettest tropical cyclones

References

External links
Tropical Cyclones During the Years 1900 – 1952
Tropical Cyclone Point Maxima

1950 Pacific hurricane season
Hurricanes in Hawaii
1950 in Hawaii
Category 1 Pacific hurricanes
1950 natural disasters in the United States